Didier Lang (born 15 December 1970) is a retired French football defender.

References

1970 births
Living people
French footballers
FC Metz players
Sporting CP footballers
FC Sochaux-Montbéliard players
ES Troyes AC players
Le Mans FC players
CSO Amnéville players
Association football defenders
Ligue 1 players
Ligue 2 players
Primeira Liga players
French expatriate footballers
Expatriate footballers in Portugal
French expatriate sportspeople in Portugal